Catherine Howard (c. 1523–1542) queen consort of Henry VIII of England.

Catherine Howard may also refer to:

 Catherine Carey, Countess of Nottingham, married name Katherine Howard
 Catherine Howard, Countess of Suffolk (1564–1638), née Knyvett
 Catherine Cecil, Countess of Salisbury (c.1590-1673), née Howard  
 Catherine Howard, daughter of Henry Howard, Earl of Surrey and wife of Henry Berkeley, 7th Baron Berkeley
 Katherine G. Howard (1898–1986), politician
 Catherine Howard, Baroness Berkeley from Anne Berkeley, Baroness Berkeley
 Catherine Howard, Duchess of Norfolk, wife of Charles Howard, 10th Duke of Norfolk
 Catherine Howard (soccer), player for West Michigan Firewomen

See also
 Kate Howard, fictional character from General Hospital
 Katie Howard (disambiguation)